Jarin (also Romanized as Jarīn; also known as Chārīn and Jahrim) is a village in Khararud Rural District, in the Central District of Khodabandeh County, Zanjan Province, Iran. At the 2006 census, its population was 1,110, in 248 families.

References 

Populated places in Khodabandeh County